The Star Awards for Top 10 Most Popular Male Artistes is an award presented annually at the Star Awards, a ceremony that was established in 1994. Initially, the awards were 10 Most Popular Artistes with five male and five female artistes receiving it. In 1997, the award winners were increased to ten male artistes from five.

History 
The category was introduced in 1994, at the first Star Awards ceremony; Terence Cao, Chew Chor Meng, Li Nanxing, Sean Say, and Desmond Sim received the award as five of the male artistes of the 10 Most Popular Artistes award. The winners are determined by a majority vote from the public via telephone and SMS text voting. 

During 1994 and 1995, the Most Popular Actor award and Most Popular Actress were also awarded. It was a separate award from the 10 Most Popular Artistes award and was given out to the male artiste who topped the votes of the latter award. Li and Chen Hanwei were the recipients of this award in 1994 and 1995, respectively. In 1996, the Most Popular Actor award was retired.

Since 1997, the number of recipients for each category were expanded to ten and the award was renamed as Top 10 Most Popular Male Artistes.

In 2017, the award nominees were increased from 20 to 24, where four artistes were eliminated after the prelude shows while the other 20 continue to compete in the category in the week leading up to the main ceremony. 

In 2021, the award nominees was increased from 20 to 30 which means the competition was even more intense for the artistes, who missed out on their glamour night out when the 2020 event was suspended due to the COVID-19 pandemic.

Since the ceremony held in 2021, Pornsak remains as the only male artiste to have the most wins without achieving the All-Time Favourite Artiste award, with nine. Pornsak is also the first and only male artiste who had nine wins to fail to win in the year he was nominated for his tenth and final award. In addition, Chen Shucheng have been nominated on 22 occasions, more than any other male artiste. Chen Shucheng also holds the record for the most nominations without a win, with 18 (he eventually won his first award in 2019). Richard Low is currently the male artiste who has the most nominations without a win, with 15.

Eligibility 
Before 1997, only Mediacorp actors were eligible to be nominated for the award. This rule was removed in 1997 onwards to allow the Mediacorp male artistes from the variety sector to contest for the award.

In 2018, the rules were changed to allow contracted and project-based artistes to be nominated and/or receive the award. 

13 male artistes have received the award for ten times and were given the All-Time Favourite Artiste award, and are no longer eligible for the running of the award. Amongst them are Chew Chor Meng, Li Nanxing, Xie Shaoguang, and Elvin Ng who had all won in this category for ten consecutive times since their first nomination.

Recipients
Since its inception, the award has been given to 52 male artistes. Shaun Chen, Marcus Chin, Guo Liang, Lee Teng, Pierre Png, Desmond Tan, Romeo Tan, Brandon Wong, Xu Bin, and Ben Yeo are the most recent winners in this category.

Award records

References

Star Awards